John Chambré Brabazon, 10th Earl of Meath KP PC (I) (9 April 1772 – 15 March 1851), was an Anglo-Irish peer.

He was the third son of Anthony Brabazon, 8th Earl of Meath, and Grace Leigh. He became Earl of Meath in 1797 after the death of his brother William Brabazon, 9th Earl of Meath, who was killed in a duel with a Captain Robert Gore. He became Custos Rotulorum of County Wicklow from 1797 to 1851 and, from 1831 to 1851, Lord Lieutenant of County Dublin.

On 10 September 1831, by reason of his descent from the last Viscount Chaworth, he was created Baron Chaworth in the Peerage of the United Kingdom, giving him the automatic right to a seat in the British House of Lords. He was appointed a Knight of the Order of St Patrick on 24 November 1831 and was invested as a member of the Privy Council of Ireland in 1833.

On 31 December 1801, he married Lady Melosina Adelaide Meade, daughter of John Meade, 1st Earl of Clanwilliam and Theodosia Hawkins-Magill, and had six children, including William, who succeeded to the title.

References

External links

1772 births
1851 deaths
Knights of St Patrick
Lord-Lieutenants of Dublin
Members of the Privy Council of Ireland
John
10
Irish knights
Peers of the United Kingdom created by William IV